This is a list of archives in Ukraine.

Archives in Ukraine 

 National Archives of Ukraine

Central State Archives 

 Central State Archives of Supreme Bodies of Power and Government of Ukraine
 Central State Archives of Public Organizations of Ukraine
 Central State Historical Archives of Ukraine in Kyiv - CDIAK (ЦДІАК)
  - TsDIAL (ЦДІАЛ)
 Central State CinePhotoPhono Archives of Ukraine
 Central State Scientific and Technical Archives of Ukraine
 Central State Archives Museum of Literature and Art of Ukraine
 Central State Archives of Foreign Archival Ucrainica
 Central State Electronic Archives of Ukraine
 State Archives Research Library of Kyiv

Main supporting institutions
 Ukrainian Research Institute of Archival Affairs and Records Management
 Science-reference library of the Central State Archives of Ukraine
 State Center for documents conservation of the National Archive Fund
 Main publishing periodical "Visnyk" (Herald)

Regional State Archives 

  - DAARC (ДААРК) - in Simferopol
  - DAVO (ДАВО) - in Vinnytsia
  - DAVoO (ДАВоО) - in Lutsk
  - DADnO (ДАДнО) - in Dnipro
  - DADoO (ДАДоО) - moved (without its documents) to Kostiantynivka in 2014, documents mostly looted by Russian occupiers
  - DAZO (ДАЖО) - in Zhytomyr
  - DAZkO (ДАЗкО) - in Uzhhorod
  - DAZpO (ДАЗпО) - in Zaporizhzhia
  - DAIFO (ДАІФО) - in Ivano-Frankivsk
  - DAKO (ДАКО) - in Kyiv
  - DAKrO or DAKIRO (ДАКрО) - in Kropyvnytskyi
  - DALuO (ДАЛуО) - moved (without its documents) to Sievierodonetsk in 2014, documents mostly looted by Russian occupiers
  - DALO (ДАЛО) - in Lviv
  - DAMO (ДАМО) - in Mykolaiv
  - DAOO (ДАОО) - in Odesa
  - DAPO (ДАПО) - in Poltava
  - DARO (ДАРО) - in Rivne
  - DASO (ДАСО) - in Sumy
  - DATO (ДАТО) - in Ternopil
  - DAHO (ДАХО) - in Kharkiv
  - DAHeO (ДАХеО) - in Kherson, approximately fifty percent of the documents (and most of the WWII era documents) looted by retreating Russian occupiers in November 2022
  - DAHmO (ДАХмО) - in Khmelnytskyi
  - DACHkO (ДАЧкО) - in Cherkasy
  - DACHvO (ДАЧвО) - in Chernivtsi
  - DACHhO (ДАЧгО) - in Chernihiv
  - DAK (ДАК) in Kyiv
  - DAS (ДАС) in Sevastopol

Other 

 Vernadsky National Library of Ukraine

See also 

 List of archives
 List of libraries in Ukraine
 List of museums in Ukraine
 Culture of Ukraine

References

External links 
 Archives of Ukraine

 
Archives
Ukraine
Archives